Miroslav Cerar (born 28 October 1939) is a Yugoslav former gymnast and lawyer of Slovene ethnicity who won the pommel horse event at the 1964 and 1968 Summer Olympics. He also won three world and nine European championships.

Domestically, Cerar won 13 national titles and was chosen eight times as Yugoslavia’s Athlete of the Year. He was awarded the Olympic Order in Silver by the International Olympic Committee. He was member of the Slovenian Olympic Academy, the Fair Play Commission of the Slovenian Olympic Committee, and the Executive Committee of the European Fair Play Movement.

Family
Cerar was married to Zdenka Cerar (née Prusnik), who was the first female State Prosecutor General of the Republic of Slovenia (1999–2004), Minister of Justice (2004) and Vice-President of the LDS. In her youth she was twice Youth Champion in gymnastics in Yugoslavia and a member of the Yugoslav team. After she ended her active career, she became a coach and referee.

Cerar was a student of law and a lawyer for many years. His son Miro Cerar is also a lawyer, and a politician. He was Slovenia's prime minister and head of the SMC party.

Awards and honors 
In 1999 Cerar was inducted into the International Gymnastics Hall of Fame, and in 2011 into the Slovenian Athletes Hall of Fame

References

1939 births
Living people
Yugoslav male artistic gymnasts
Slovenian male artistic gymnasts
Olympic gymnasts of Yugoslavia
Gymnasts at the 1960 Summer Olympics
Gymnasts at the 1964 Summer Olympics
Gymnasts at the 1968 Summer Olympics
Olympic bronze medalists for Yugoslavia
Olympic gold medalists for Yugoslavia
Olympic medalists in gymnastics
World champion gymnasts
Medalists at the World Artistic Gymnastics Championships
Sportspeople from Ljubljana
European champions for Yugoslavia
Medalists at the 1968 Summer Olympics
Medalists at the 1964 Summer Olympics
Universiade medalists in gymnastics
20th-century Slovenian lawyers
Universiade silver medalists for Yugoslavia
Medalists at the 1965 Summer Universiade
European champions in gymnastics
Yugoslav lawyers
21st-century Slovenian lawyers